Imaginary Numbers is the fourth EP and seventh release by American rock band The Maine. It was released on December 10, 2013. This is the first acoustic EP of the band. Imaginary Numbers was written and produced by The Maine themselves.

Track listing

On December 8, 2013, "The Making of Imaginary Numbers" video was uploaded on The Maine's YouTube channel.

Charts

References

External links

Imaginary Numbers at YouTube (streamed copy where licensed)

The Maine (band) EPs
2013 EPs